Brisbane was an electoral district, located in the colony of New South Wales, Australia, and part of the New South Wales Legislative Assembly. It was created for the July 1859 election, partly replacing Stanley Boroughs and including the settlement of Brisbane.  It was abolished in December 1859 as a result of the separation of Queensland.

Members for Brisbane

Election results

Elections in the 1850s

1859

References

Former electoral districts of New South Wales
Electoral districts of New South Wales in the area of Queensland
History of Queensland
Constituencies established in 1859
Constituencies disestablished in 1859
1859 establishments in Australia
1859 disestablishments in Australia